Optima is an EP by Christ Analogue, released in 1996 by Re-Constriction Records. It was released in support of the band's second album In Radiant Decay and to promote remix material by Wade Alin, who had received attention for his club version of "Deep" by Collide.

Track listing

Personnel
Adapted from the Optima liner notes.

Christ Analogue
 Wade Alin – instruments, assistant engineering (6)
 Rey Guajardo – instruments
 Sean Ivy – instruments
 Markus Von Prause – instruments

Additional musicians
 Tracy Moody – additional guitar

Production and design
 Immaculate – design

Release history

References

External links 
 Optima at Discogs (list of releases)

1996 EPs
Remix EPs
Christ Analogue albums
Re-Constriction Records EPs